El Negrillar or Negros de Aras is a volcanic field in the Andes. Located south of the Salar de Atacama and west of the Cordón de Púlar, it generated cinder cones and andesitic lava flows. The volcanic field may be of Holocene age.  

There are 66 vents, 44 of which are cones with shapes ranging from rings over horseshoes to irregular shapes. It has about 0.23 vents per square kilometre. They feature surface landforms channels, folds, levees, lobes, ogives and rafts. Owing to the arid climate, landforms are well preserved. A groundwater system underlies the volcanic field and some cones formed through phreatomagmatic eruptions. El Negrillar is located in a complex tectonic regime, with ongoing compression but possibly local extensional tectonics and is located within the Negros de Aras graben.

Radiometric dating has yielded ages of less than 1.5 million years and of 600,000 ± 400,000 years. While the field was sometimes considered to be of Holocene age, the Global Volcanism Program considers it of Pleistocene age as none of the volcanoes are younger than a 100,000 year old volcano farther north. Parts of the Holocene Socompa debris avalanche overlie the field; it formed about 7,200 years ago. The town of Tilomonte and various power lines, mines and water wells are in the area. Reconstructed effusion rates exceed .

El Negrillar has erupted basaltic andesite containing olivine, andesite containing either olivine-pyroxene, pyroxene or pyroxene-hornblende, and dacite. It defines a volcanic arc-type magma. The origin of the more basic lavas of this field has been explained with olivine differentiation.

See also
 Socompa

References

Volcanic fields
Volcanoes of Chile